Paradise (Swedish: Paradiset) is a 1955 Swedish drama film directed by Arne Ragneborn and starring Edvin Adolphson, Gunnel Broström and Eva Dahlbeck. It was shot at the Stocksund Studios in Stockholm. The film's sets were designed by the art director Carl Gyllenberg.

Synopsis
Two men lose their jobs due to their heavy drinking. While one is able to overcome alcoholism and get a steady job, the other struggles.

Cast
 Edvin Adolphson as Rudolf Ekström
 Gunnel Broström as Rita Ekström
 Naima Wifstrand as Mrs. Ekström
 Åke Grönberg as Betil Karlsson
 Eva Dahlbeck as Ulla Karlsson
 Doris Svedlund as Barbro
 Arne Ragneborn as Lillebror
 Åke Claesson as Doctor Martin
 Hugo Björne as Erik Svenning
 Harry Ahlin as Ville
 Elof Ahrle as Bertil's colleague
 Gösta Bernhard as Arne
 Eivor Engelbrektsson as Lily
 Stig Järrel as Lars
 Gösta Prüzelius as member of sobriety organization
 Sif Ruud as Nora
 Georg Skarstedt as Egon
 Carl Ström as Mats
 Lars Burman as drunk 
 Sven-Axel Carlsson as skier who finds Rudolf
 Linnéa Hillberg as wife of sobriety organization member

References

Bibliography 
 Qvist, Per Olov & von Bagh, Peter. Guide to the Cinema of Sweden and Finland. Greenwood Publishing Group, 2000.

External links 
 

1955 films
Swedish drama films
1955 drama films
1950s Swedish-language films
Films directed by Arne Ragneborn
Swedish black-and-white films
1950s Swedish films